Anura Srinath (born September 6, 1957) is a Sri Lankan Artist, Painter, Illustrator and a Cartoonist

Early life
Anura was born in Sri Lanka and educated at Lumbini College (Colombo). He grew up in a home which surroundings were full of sketches of temple paintings and traditional Sinhalese art and he showed a passion and a skill for drawing from an early age. His father rejected the idea of a career in art. Anura's father, M.S Perera, hoped his son would become a Doctor, and though Anura would study in Biology stream for Advanced Level in School.

Career beginnings
After leaving school he joined the Upali Group of Newspapers as a cartoonist for the comic-strip paper ‘Suhada’ in 1980. In 1981 Upali Newspapers (Private) Limited was launched and he was recruited as an artist for the "Chitramitra" comic magazine by the group.

His paintings are found in various museums and galleries abroad, as well as in private collections in Sri Lanka and throughout the world.

Exhibitions

Anuralokaya solo exhibition
 Anuralokaya 1 (August 2012), National Art Gallery, Sri Lanka
 Anuralokaya 2 (January 2013), Matara
 Anuralokaya 3 (February 2013), Anuradhapura
 Anuralokaya 4 (November 2013), Boralesgamuwa
 Anuralokaya 5 (2014), University of Sri Jayewardenepura
 Anuralokaya 6
 Anuralokaya 7
 Anuralokaya 8
 Anuralokaya 9
 Anuralokaya 10
 Anuralokaya 11 (July 2016)
 Anuralokaya 12
 Anuralokaya 13
 Anuralokaya 14
 Anuralokaya 15 (September 2017)
 Anuralokaya 16 (September, 2017)
 Anuralokaya 17 (October, 2017)

Siththaru Andi Roo (සිත්තරු ඇඳි රූ)
Siththaru Andi Roo 1 (December 2011)
Siththaru Andi Roo 2 (June 2013)
Siththaru Andi Roo 3 (October 2015) 
Siththaru Andi Roo 4 (November 2016)

13 Strokes / Lionel Wendt Art Centre
A three-day exhibition will be held at The Lionel Wendt Art Center featuring 13 artists.

Speculo 2017: National Art Festival
Art exhibition hosted by Sri Lankan airlines at J. D. A. Perera Gallery.

Kala Pola (1995 - 2019)
Participant of the annual open air art fair from 1995 - 2019

References 

1957 births
Living people
Lumbini College alumni
Sinhalese artists
Sri Lankan painters
Sri Lankan cartoonists
Sri Lankan illustrators
21st-century Sri Lankan painters